Mezhdunarodnaya:

 Mezhdunarodnaya (Moscow Metro)
 Mezhdunarodnaya (Saint Petersburg Metro)